Dorstenia panamensis is a plant species in the family Moraceae which is native to Panama.

References

panamensis
Endemic flora of Panama
Plants described in 1982